Friedrich Johann Graf von Medem (29 August 1912 in Remten, Russian Empire presently Latvia – 1 May 1984 in Bogotá, Colombia) was a Baltic German zoologist who emigrated to Colombia at age 38 (in 1950) and later became a representative of the IUCN Crocodiles Specialist Group for South America. He was also known as Federico Medem and published under this name.

Eponyms
Numerous species have been named after Medem, including four reptiles and two frogs. 
Micrurus medemi , a coral snake
Centrolene medemi , a frog
Amphisbaena medemi , an amphisbaenian
Neusticurus medemi , a spectacled lizard
Anolis medemi , an anole lizard.
Pristimantis medemi , a frog

References

Further reading
Lamar, William W. (1984). "Federico Medem (29 August 1912–1 May 1984)". Herpetologica 40 (4): 468-472.

1912 births
1984 deaths
20th-century Colombian zoologists
20th-century German zoologists
Soviet emigrants to Colombia